Chic! is a 2015 French romantic comedy film directed by Jérôme Cornuau.

Cast 
 Fanny Ardant as Alicia Ricosi 
 Marina Hands as Hélène Birk 
 Éric Elmosnino as Julien Lefort 
 Laurent Stocker as Alan Bergam   
 Catherine Hosmalin as Caroline Langer 
 Philippe Duquesne as Jean-Guy 
 India Hair as Karine Lefort

References

External links 
 

2015 films
2015 romantic comedy films
2010s French-language films
French romantic comedy films
Films about fashion in France
StudioCanal films
2010s French films